
Thomas Badger (1792–1868) was an artist in Boston, Massachusetts, in the 19th century. He specialized in portraits. He trained with John Ritto Penniman. Portrait subjects included: John Abbot; William Allen, of Bowdoin College; Asa Clapp; Julia Margaretta Dearborn; George B. Doane; Henry Wadsworth Longfellow; Benjamin Page; Thomas Paul, of Boston's African Meeting House; Jotham Sewall; Benjamin Vaughan; Charles Vaughan; Frances Western Apthorp Vaughan; George Wadsworth Wells; Jonathan Winship. Around 1849 a still life by Badger in the collection of the Boston Museum was considered "a highly finished and excellent picture, something in the style of Van Huysom. There is a truth and reality in the articles represented, seldom seen in this class of pictures."

He married Rebecca Melendy (1795–1852); children included George Washington (died at age 16 in 1853). He was also related to the portrait artist Joseph Badger. He died of "lung fever" in Cambridge in 1868. Works by Badger are in the collections of the Boston Athenaeum; Maine Historical Society; Colby College; the Brick Store Museum and Fine Arts Museums of San Francisco.

Images

References

Further reading
 Thomas Badger: Portrait of an American Painter. Kennebunk, Maine: Brick Store Museum, 1993.

External links

 WorldCat. Badger, Thomas 1792-1868
 Chrysler Museum of Art. Badger's Still Life with Fruit and Wine, c. 1817.

1792 births
1868 deaths
American portrait painters
Artists from Boston
19th-century American painters
American male painters
19th-century American male artists